FC Lantana Tallinn is a defunct Estonian football club. Lantana won the Estonian Meistriliiga in 1996 and 1997. The club was dissolved after the 1999 season.

History
Lantana Tallinn entered Estonian footballing parlance when the Belov family bought out the pre-existing Nikol Tallinn in late 1994. Their original colours were black and white striped shirts, with black shorts and socks, although they changed these to sky blue and royal blue following the 1998 season.

The new side enjoyed near instant success, finishing second in their first season and winning the Meistriliiga title in 1995–96. That season also saw them enter European competition for the first time, however a 2–1 UEFA Cup victory over Latvians DAG-Liepāja was changed to a 3–0 defeat after Lantana fielded an ineligible player, and they exited in the preliminary round.

Lantana won the Meistriliiga again in 1996–97, however defeat by Sadam Tallinn in the Estonian Cup final denied them a double. This was their first season playing at the suburban Viimsi Staadion, having previously played at Tallinn's main Kadriorg Stadium. Viimsi has a capacity of 2000 and a pitch 105 by 70 meters. The side enjoyed its first European success that year, knocking out Icelandic side ÍBV Vestmannaeyjar in their UEFA Cup Preliminary Round tie before losing 4–2 on aggregate to FC Aarau.

Despite their table-topping league form, Lantana did not supply any players to the Estonian national side. This was due to the perception that the club was representative of the ethnically-Russian minority in Estonia, and indeed many of the squad were Russian and ineligible under FIFA rules to represent Estonia.

League form was more erratic in 1997–98 while Lantana were again beaten Cup finalists, losing to Flora Tallinn. Lantana also lost in their only European tie, 3–0 on aggregate to Jazz Pori. After further mixed form in 1998 and 1999, the side was wound up.

Achievements
Meistriliiga (2): 1995–96, 1996–97
Estonian SuperCup (1): 1997–98

Lantana Tallinn in Estonian Football Championship

Lantana Tallinn in Europe
 1Q = First Qualifying Round
 2Q = Second Qualifying Round

Notable former players

External links
1999 Cup Winners' Cup Lantana Tallinn 0–1 Hearts (photos)

 
Lantana Tallinn
Meistriliiga clubs
Football clubs in Tallinn
1994 establishments in Estonia
1999 disestablishments in Estonia
Association football clubs established in 1994